2021 Quetta bombing may refer to: 

Quetta Serena Hotel bombing, in April
August 2021 Quetta bombing
September 2021 Quetta bombing